Bunga Hayat is a small town in Pakpattan District, Sahiwal Division, Punjab, Pakistan, having a population of 10,000. It is named after Mian Hayat Maneka, an ancestor of the Maneka Family.
Prominent politicians from the area are Mian Khudayar Khan Maneka,  elected twice as the MLA before partition. Mian Farrukh Mumtaz maneka (MPA)  Mian Muhammad Ali Maneka, Mian Khurram Mumtaz Maneka (UC Nazim) and Mian Asadullah Mumtaz Maneka(Ex.Dist Naib Nazim Pakpattan).Mian Muhammad Yar khan Maneka (Member Zilla council 2 times ) and Mian Mimshad Ahmed Maneka (Member zilla council)
Their father Mian Mumtaz Maneka was also an influential political leader of the area.
Among 28 Union Councils of Tehsil Pakpattan, Bunga Hayat Union Council is UC-03. UC Bunga Hayat Consists of Bunga Hayat, Nanakpur, Asadullah, Arazi Amar Singh, Magan Pur, 5 Marla Scheme & 7 Marla Scheme.

Location 
Bunga Hayat is situated on Kasur - Multan road (ancient Delhi Multan Road) between Depalpur & Pakpattan. Bunga Hayat is a junction point (Chowk) of Kasur-Multan road and Sahiwal - Haveli Lakha , Sulemanki Headworks Road. Distance from Bunga Hayat to surrounding cities are given below:
Depalpur 25 Km (North), 
Pakpattan 21 Km (South), 
Sahiwal 50 Km (West), 
Haveli Lakha 18 Km, Head Sulemanki 39 Km (East, along Indian Border).

Administrative Division 
Bunga Hayat is Union Council # 03 among 28 Union Councils of Tehsil Pakpattan. Union Council forms the second-tier of local government and fifth administrative division in Pakistan, this consists of a directly elected Chairman, Vice Chairman and six general members representing each ward of the union council. Rana Amjad Ilyas is current chairman of UC Bunga Hayat & Mian Hassan Sukhera is Vice Chairman.

Education 
 Govt. High School, Bunga Hayat is the oldest educational institute providing teaching services from 1901 as primary and then lower middle. In 2007 it became a middle school. 
 Govt. Girls High School, Bunga Hayat  
 LEEDS College, Karmanwala Campus, situated at Haveli Road Bunga Hayat. Leeds College is the only College of the town providing education till Bachelor's Degree. There also exists a Campus of Virtual University Pakistan for Master Level Programs & affiliated Courses. 

The following schools are also present
Al-Madina High school
The Beaconsfield International High School
Baba-Farid Model High School
The City Lyceum School
The Educators
Allied Public School
Dar Ul Ilam public school
Al Saim Islamic School
Mudrassah Muhammadi Nizamia binnat ul Islam

Historical Places 
Mumtaz Manzil 

Dera & residence of Mian Khuda Yar Manika (Late), was built in 1938. Now it is a hub of local politics. The heirs of Manika family are playing the leading role on Local Govt & Provincial Politics. Mian Farrukh Mumtaz Manika (the grandson of Mian Khuda Yar Manika) is serving MPA (Elections 2018) & Ex Tehsil Nazim Pakpattan. Mian Asadullah Mumtaz Maneka was Ex Naib Nazim of District Pakpattan.

Jamia Masjid Al Hayat Bunga Hayat 

Another historical monument which was built in 1936 by Mian Khuda Yar Manika (Late). White marble was used as the outer layer of Masjid for decoration. The white Marble was so glazy and shiny that a mud mask was overlapped on the shiny outer face of Masjid to prevent it from being hit by airstrikes during Indo Pak war in 1965.

Canal Rest House 

During the British reign, in 1920-1926 the irrigation system was established in Punjab. 10 Canal Colonies were built in Punjab to irrigate Punjab. Neli Bar Colony was constructed in this era, by constructing canals & Canal Rest Houses. The Canal Rest House was built in 1926 for the accommodation of Irrigation Officer. It was a magnificent building but it ruined due to the lack of interest of competent authority.

Darbar Khawja Qamar u Din Chishti 

Khawja Qamar u Din Chishti was a Sufi saint of Bunga Hayat & preacher of Islam. He was the pioneer of Miana Family. Khawja Qamar u Din Chishti died in the early 1900s.

Amenities 
Ali Bangles And Clothes House (20years working time)
Wajad shopping center 
Amjad Mehndi shopping center
Abdul-Kareem super store
Al Karan Shopping Center
Lahori Gift Center
Safwan Hotle & Restaurant
Al Mushtaq Pan Shop & Juice
 Rehman Traders ( Pesticides )

Sports 
Football A football stadium was established under the supervision of  Mian Asdullah Mumtaz Khan Maneka (Ex District Nazim Pakpattan), owner of AlHassan football club. On every Eid the Rana Sohail shaheed football tournament is organised to honor a martyr of the Pakistani army, Rana Sohail.

Badminton
 Al Mumtaz Badminton Club Bunga Hayat has its court situated in RHC Bunga Hayat and run by Coach Muhammad Azam, A legendary Badminton Player of District Pakpattan. Al Mumtaz Badminton Club has been existing from 1990. Have groomed a no. of players to represt Bunga Hayat in Provincial, Division & District Level.

Development 
Hafiz Rabnawaz Memorial Society (HRMS) aids development, at the community level. HRMS workers started Muhafiz emergency rescue with the help of rescue1122. It plants trees in different villages. It was founded by Mian Muhammad Mumtaz Maneka..

Colonies of Bunga Hayat 
 Bunga Hayat Old Village
 Mustafa Abad
 Shabbir Abad
 Jinnah Abadi 5 Marla Scheme
 Mumtaz Abad
 Rajput Colony
 Samail Abad
 Abadi Bhattian Wali
Jinnah Abadi 5 Marla Scheme is the Largest settlement of Bunga Hayat with a length of 2 km along with road of Kasur Multan Road, from Bunga Hayat to Chak Bedi.

Mosque of Bunga Hayat  
Jamia Masjid Siddiq e akbar The largest and most beautiful mosque
 Jamia Masjid Bunga Hayat, the oldest & Historic Mosque of Bunga Hayat, located in the old village of Bunga Hayat.
 Masjid Mumtaz Khan 
 Jamia Masjid Ayesha Saddiqua
 Ghosia Masjid 
 Masjid Ali, Faizan e Madina Bunga Hayat
 Madni Masjid
 Masjid Ahl e Hadees
 Masjid Al Noor

Health Facilities 

Rural Health Center (RHC) Bunga Hayat is the only Government Hospital in Bunga Hayat, providing health facilities to the surroundings villages of Bunga Hayat. RHC Bunga Hayat providing quality & free health service 24/7.

Constituency 
NA:145                         
PP:191
Populated places in Pakpattan District